Francisca Ebelin Cebelin Ortiz González (born 5 February 1971), known as Ebelin Ortiz, is a Peruvian actress, television presenter, and singer.

Career

Ortiz hosted the family program Nuestra Casa on Frecuencia Latina in 2005.

In 2006, she played social activist María Elena Moyano in the miniseries Viento y Arena, based on the history of the Villa El Salvador district.

In 2008, Ortiz participated in the reality show Bailando por un Sueño. Next, she starred in the miniseries Magnolia Merino, based on the public life of the television host Magaly Medina, which was widely criticized by followers of Medina.

In 2009 she debuted as a singer with Negra Soy, a repertoire of Afro-Peruvian music that was presented by the Centro Cultural Negro Continuo, and released her first self-titled album. The same year she competed on the Gisela Valcárcel reality show El Show de los sueños, where she took fourth place.

In 2011, she performed in the telenovela  as Petronila.

As part of the cast of Chronicle of a Death Foretold, Ortiz traveled to Colombia to present the play at the 13th Ibero-American Theater Festival of Bogotá, which was held from 23 March to 8 April 2012.

On television, she appeared in the telenovela .

In 2013 she presented the one-woman show Esa costilla frágil and had a role in the film The Gospel of the Flesh.

Filmography

Telenovelas and dramatic series
  (1997) as Rosa
  (1998) as Juanita
 Pobre Diabla (2000) as Norma
 Soledad (2001) as La Caribeña
 Teatro desde el teatro (2003–2006)
 Eva del Edén (2004) as María Angola
 Viento y arena (2005) as María Elena Moyano
  (2006) as Rosaura
 Esta sociedad 2 (2008) as Rosaura
  (2008) as Lady Toro
 La Fuerza Fénix (2008) as Sonia
 Magnolia Merino (2008–2009) as Magnolia Merino
  (2011) as Petronila
  (2012) as Julieta
 Solamente milagros (2013), episode "Mujer o madre" as Celeste
 Goleadores (2014)
  (2017) as Carmen

TV programs
 Hola Yola 
 Por Primera Vez (1997)
 Nuestra Casa (2005)
 Bailando por un Sueño, Heroine / 7th place (2008)
 El show de los sueños, Heroine / 4th place (2009)
 Casi Ángeles (2010)

Films
 Los Herederos (2005)
 The Gospel of the Flesh (2013)

Theater
 La Capa, La Vaca y La Zapatilla
 4x4: Cuentos a todo terreno (2007)
 Rebelión de los Chanchos (2007)
 Viga Bulla
 Recontrahamlet (2008)
 La Corporación (2008)
 Esa frágil costilla (2008)
 Amor sin amantes (2009)
 Noises Off (2009)
 Amores de un siglo (2009)
 Jarana (2010)
 The Vagina Monologues (2010)
 Chronicle of a Death Foretold (2011–2012) as María Alejandrina Cervantes/Hermana de Bayardo San Román
 Hairspray (2012) as Member of the Dynamites
 Te odio amor mío (2012)
 Esa costilla frágil (2013), one-woman show
 Mamma Mia (2017)

References

External links
 
 

1971 births
20th-century Peruvian actresses
21st-century Peruvian actresses
Actresses from Lima
Living people
Peruvian musical theatre actresses
Peruvian telenovela actresses
Peruvian television presenters
Reality dancing competition contestants
Singers from Lima
Peruvian women television presenters